Alma Constantia Arnell (2 May 1857 – 13 September 1934) was a Swedish painter.

Biography 
Born in Säbrå, Ångermanland, Arnell studied in Stockholm at Axel Kulle's school of painting under Gustaf Cederström and Anders Zorn as well as in Paris at the Académie Colarossi and for several years in Rome. In 1904 she was elected to the Nya Idun women's association.

In the late 1890s and early 1900s, at least until 1907, Alma Arnell shared a studio with Hilma af Klint and Lotten Rönquist in the so-called  ('Studio Building') in Stockholm, which the Royal Swedish Academy of Fine Arts owned at Hamngatan 5 at the intersection of Hamngatan and Kungsträdgården. The property was the cultural centre of Stockholm at the time.

Arnell died in 1934 in Stockholm.

She was primarily a genre painter, and a portrait and landscape painter. Some of her work is on display at Nationalmuseum.

References

1857 births
1934 deaths
19th-century Swedish painters
20th-century Swedish painters
People from Härnösand Municipality
Swedish genre painters
Swedish landscape painters
Swedish portrait painters
Swedish women painters
20th-century Swedish women artists
19th-century Swedish women artists
Swedish expatriates in France
Swedish expatriates in Italy

Members of Nya Idun